Yelena Kotelnikova (born 29 September 1969) is a Russian judoka. She competed at the 1992 Summer Olympics and the 1996 Summer Olympics.

References

External links
 

1969 births
Living people
Russian female judoka
Olympic judoka of the Unified Team
Olympic judoka of Russia
Judoka at the 1992 Summer Olympics
Judoka at the 1996 Summer Olympics
Place of birth missing (living people)
20th-century Russian women
21st-century Russian women